Warren Central High School may refer to:

 Warren Central High School (Indiana), in Warren Township on the east side of Indianapolis, Indiana
 Warren Central High School (Kentucky), in Bowling Green, Warren County, Kentucky
 Warren Central High School (Mississippi), in Vicksburg, Warren County, Mississippi